Hyphomicrobium methylovorum is a bacterium from the genus of Hyphomicrobium which was isolated from soil samples in Japan.

References

External links
Type strain of Hyphomicrobium methylovorum at BacDive -  the Bacterial Diversity Metadatabase

Hyphomicrobiales
Bacteria described in 1983